Bila Kamianka (Urum: Ахташ) is a village in Boykivske Raion (district) in Donetsk Oblast of eastern Ukraine, at  south from the centre of Donetsk city.

Demographics
Native language as of the Ukrainian Census of 2001:
Ukrainian 0%
Russian 100.00%

References

External links
 Weather forecast for Bila Kamyanka

Villages in Kalmiuske Raion